Apogevmatini ("Afternoon") was a Greek newspaper published nationally in Athens. The newspaper was founded by Nasos and Sakis Botsis in 1952. It had a semi-liberal approach towards the economy and a right-wing political orientation.

In 2010 the Sarantopoulos family, the then owners of the title, declared the newspaper bankrupt.

In 2023 the newspaper recirculated under publisher Nikos Kourtakis, who also is head editor of the newspaper Parapolitika.

References

1952 establishments in Greece
2010 disestablishments in Greece
Defunct newspapers published in Greece
Greek-language newspapers
Newspapers published in Athens
Newspapers established in 1952
Publications disestablished in 2010